Claudio Passarelli (born January 18, 1965, in Ludwigshafen) is a German former wrestler who won the world championship in 1989. His brother Pasquale was also a successful wrestler.

References

External links
 

1965 births
Living people
Olympic wrestlers of West Germany
Olympic wrestlers of Germany
Wrestlers at the 1988 Summer Olympics
Wrestlers at the 1992 Summer Olympics
German male sport wrestlers
Sportspeople from Ludwigshafen
German people of Italian descent
World Wrestling Championships medalists
20th-century German people
21st-century German people